The Breitenbach in Baden-Württemberg, Landkreis Reutlingen, is a southern and orographic left tributary of the Echaz. It is a southern and left tributary of the Echaz, which is located in Reutlingen..

Geography

Sources 
The Breitenbach has its source at Albtrauf, the northwestern steep drop of the Swabian Alb. A little further south and thus above the main spring there is another spring at a little above  elevation.

Course 
At the beginning, the Breitenbach, which mainly flows northwards, flows through the Selchen valley and remains in the forest until it crosses the Landesstraße  383 above Reutlingen after about half of its course. Then the brook, now lined by trees and bushes, runs through agricultural land at a westerly distance from the centre of Reutlingen. After that it crosses under the Bundesstraße 28 and the railway line Plochingen-Tübingen in Reutlingen.

Estuary 
The Breitenbach estuary, on its last meters flowing to the northwest, in the southern part of the Reutlingen district Betzingen at the cemetery In der Au into the Neckar inflow Echaz coming from the east-southeast.

Tributaries and still waters 
The tributaries of the Breitebach and the still waters at and near the stream belong - ordered from the source to the estuary (waters of higher order correspondingly indented under their receiving water; lengths and areas of waters according to the geodata viewer; elevation in meters (m) above sea level, mostly interpolated according to the contour lines there):
 Ehrensbach, from right to below  elevation shortly before the road from Pfullingen to Gönningen, ; originates at below 560 m on the northern slope of the Gielsberg
 Tributary, from the left in Wolfsloch to above , 1.7 km; originates at about 580 m at the northern foot of the Stöffelberg with ruin of Stöffel's castle ruin
 Breitwiesenbach, from right to below  elevation, 1.2 km; originates at over 500 m on the Pfingstweide in the forest west of the Pfullinger Georgenhof
  feeds a lake in a valley clearing, .
 Stadtwiesenbach, from left to above 410 m, 1.2 km; originates at over 500 m at the landfill at Käpfle
 (Tributary from the Eichwald), from left to below  elevation at the exit into a southern corridor bay, 1,1 km; originates at about 460 m  in the "Eichwald
 Schinderbachgraben, from the right a few steps further, 1.5 km; originates at about 510 m in the forest a little north of the "Pfingstweide" and passes the "Teufelsklinge".
  feeds a pond in the middle of the bay, 2,2 ha
 Eichwäldlesgraben, from the left to about 385 m shortly before the L 383, 1.7 km Drains the landfill at the Hofgut Alteburg
 Schinderreingraben, from the right just after the road, 1.0 km; originates at about 430 m in the woods Hohlichtenrain
 Schlattwiesenbach, from the right at about 380 m elevation at the northern tip of the motor sports area, 2.2 km; originates at below 545 m in the Rötwald
  feeds up by 39 m of some ponds in the middle of the southern edge of the sports area around the stadium Kreuzeich, the largest 0.8 ha and 0.3 ha
 Scheuerlesbach, from the left to 363 m, 3.5 km; originates at below 525 m west of the Alteburg court estate at the edge of the forest
 (Shorter source branch), from left to below 430 m elevation still before the exit of the forest, 0.9 km; originates at about 470 m in the forest at the Cross holm oak
 (Tributary), from the right to about 380 m in Listhof Nature Reserve, 0.7 km
  Pond in the cemetery next to the estuary, 0.1 ha

References

See also
List of rivers of Baden-Württemberg

Rivers of Baden-Württemberg
Rivers of Germany